College Hill: Celebrity Edition is a revival of the BET reality series College Hill, featuring celebrities living together and attending Texas Southern University. Cast includes NeNe Leakes, Ray J, Lamar Odom, Big Freedia, Stacey Dash, DreamDoll, India Love and Slim Thug. It airs on BET+ with new episodes premiering on Thursdays. 

An early preview of episode one was shown June 26, after the 2022 BET Awards and the series premiered on BET+ on June 27.

There were early reports in 2020 of the celebrity reboot with Jackson State University as the host college.

Cast
NeNe Leakes
Ray J
Lamar Odom
Big Freedia
Stacey Dash
DreamDoll
Slim Thug
India Love

Episodes

Season 2
A second season was announced to be filming in October 2022. This new cast will have season one cast member Ray J returning, and also include Amber Rose, Joseline Hernandez, Tiffany "New York" Pollard, Parker McKenna Posey, Iman Shumpert, Kwaylon "BlameItOnKway" Rogers, and O'Ryan Browner. The school they will be attending is Alabama State University, and the series is schedule to air in 2023.

References

External Links

2020s American college television series
2020s American reality television series
2022 American television series debuts
BET+ original programming
English-language television shows